Lousy Creek is a  long 1st order tributary to the Reddies River in Wilkes County, North Carolina.

Course
Lousy Creek rises about 2 miles northwest of Mulberry, North Carolina and then flows south to join the Reddies River at about 1 miles west of Fairplains.

Watershed
Lousy Creek drains  of area, receives about 51.6 in/year of precipitation, has a wetness index of 318.38, and is about 57% forested.

References

Rivers of North Carolina
Bodies of water of Wilkes County, North Carolina